Jo Eun-sook (born August 7, 1970) is a South Korean actress. She won Best Supporting Actress from the Blue Dragon Film Awards for her portrayal of a movie ticket seller dating a failed novelist in Hong Sang-soo's directorial debut The Day a Pig Fell into the Well (1996).

Filmography

Film

Television series

Variety show

Theater

Discography

Awards and nominations

References

External links
 
 
 

1970 births
Living people
South Korean television actresses
South Korean film actresses
South Korean stage actresses